Glee Sings the Beatles is the fifteenth soundtrack album by the cast of the American musical television show Glee. It was made available for pre-order on iTunes on September 10, 2013, with the expected to be released date on September 24, 2013, two days before the fifth season premiere. The album features fourteen songs recorded for the first two episodes of the season: "Love Love Love" and "Tina in the Sky with Diamonds".

Background
This is not the first time the cast of Glee pays tribute to famous artists. Recurring guest star Demi Lovato is also featured in one of the tracks of the album. Back on August 3, 2010, Paul McCartney, reportedly a fan of the show, sent a mixtape featuring his music to Glee creator Ryan Murphy in an attempt to convince Murphy to include some of the songs in the upcoming season. "I received some fantastic mixtapes from Paul McCartney a couple of weeks ago. I thought I was being punked!" Murphy said at 2010's Television Critics Association panel in Los Angeles. However, The Beatles' tribute episode was never planned to be aired on season two, three or four of the show.

The two-part premiere episodes of the tribute featured glee club director Will Schuester, portrayed by actor Matthew Morrison, assigning the students in the club to sing songs by the early Beatles (on "Love Love Love") and by the late Beatles (on "Tina in the Sky with Diamonds").

Glee has covered Beatles' songs before like "Hello Goodbye", "I Want to Hold Your Hand", "Blackbird" and "In My Life". However, these songs were not part of this album.

Reception

Critical response

The album has received generally positive reviews from professional critics. Heather Phares of Allmusic wrote: "The July 2013 death of Cory Monteith, cast a pall on the beginning of Glee's fifth season," adding that two of the album's songs, "Yesterday" and "Let It Be" were "bookended versions of the Fab Four's cheerier fare with subdued renditions of two of the band's most poignant songs". Phares also commented positively on how "[the album] could have left the cast's women stuck on the sidelines as screaming Beatlemaniacs, [but instead] it had the ladies front and center [on songs] like the sweet rendition of "Here Comes the Sun" and the playful take on "A Hard Day's Night". In other words the Allmusic review calls the album as "a promising start to season five's music".

Commercial performance
The album debuted at number 38 on the US Billboard 200.

Track listing

Personnel

Adam Anders – arranger, engineer, producer, soundtrack producer, vocals
Jacob Artist – vocals
Melissa Benoist – vocals
Chris Colfer – vocals
Darren Criss – vocals
Peer Åström – engineer, mixing, producer
Geoff Bywater – executive in charge of music
Dante Di Loreto – executive producer
Brad Falchuk – executive producer
George Harrison – composer
Blake Jenner – vocals

John Lennon – composer
Demi Lovato – vocals
Paul McCartney – composer
Kevin McHale – vocals
Lea Michele – vocals
Ryan Murphy – producer, soundtrack producer
Alex Newell – vocals
Chord Overstreet – vocals
Ryan Peterson – engineer
Naya Rivera – vocals
Becca Tobin – vocals
Jenna Ushkowitz – vocals

Charts

Release history

See also
 List of songs in Glee (season 5)

References

2013 soundtrack albums
Columbia Records soundtracks
Glee (TV series) albums
The Beatles tribute albums